East Timor participated at the 2018 Asian Games in Jakarta and Palembang, Indonesia, from 18 August to 2 September 2018. The country is planned to send 64 athletes who compete in 12 different sports.

Competitors 
The following is a list of the number of competitors representing East Timor that participated at the Games:

Athletics 

East Timor entered six athletes (3 men's and 3 women's) to participate in the athletics competition at the Games.

Boxing 

Men

Cycling

BMX

Mountain biking

Football 

East Timor competed in the Group C at the men's football event.

Summary

Men's tournament 

Roster

Group C

Karate 

East Timor participated in the karate competition at the Games with five athletes (2 men's and 3 women's).

Pencak silat 

Federasaun Silat Timor-Leste (FESTIL) entered their athletes compete in the pencak silat event at the Games.

Seni

Tanding

Shooting 

Men

Women

Swimming

East Timor entered one women's swimmer to compete at the Games.

Women

Taekwondo 

Federasaun Taekwondo Timor–Leste (FTTL) entered their taekwondo practitioners competed at the Games.

Kyorugi

Tennis 

Men

Volleyball

Beach 
Two East Timor beach volleyball teams (one men's pair and one women's pair) will compete at the Games.

Weightlifting

Men

References

Nations at the 2018 Asian Games
2018
Asian Games